Teemu Jyrki Juhani Sippo S.C.I. (born 20 May 1947) is the former Roman Catholic Bishop of Helsinki, from 2009 to 2019. He was the first Finnish-born Catholic Bishop since Arvid Kurck (1464–1522).

Life 
Teemu Sippo was born on 20 May 1947 in Lahti, Finland, into a Lutheran family. He converted to Roman Catholicism in 1966. Four years later he decided to start studying to become a priest. He became a professed member of the Congregation of the Priests of the Sacred Heart in 1970 and entered the seminary at  the University of Freiburg. He wrote his Master's thesis on Paul Tillich's principle of Protestantism. His thesis advisor was Karl Lehmann. He was ordained a priest on May 28, 1977.

After that he worked in Helsinki and Jyväskylä. On 16 June 2009, Pope Benedict XVI appointed him Bishop of Helsinki, succeeding Josef Wrobel, who had been appointed auxiliary bishop of Lublin.  He was consecrated bishop by Karl Cardinal Lehmann on September 5, 2009. His consecration took place in the Turku Cathedral, which is a Lutheran church.

Pope Francis accepted his resignation as bishop on 20 May 2019. Sippo cited health reasons for his early retirement. He had been hospitalized for three months following a fall in December 2018.

References

Additional sources 
 Maarit Olkkola: Unexplained road. Evening Times, 2009, No. 15.8., p 28.
 Fides - Catholic Diocese of Journal 08/2009, p 6.
 Katholische Nachrichten kreuz.net, Der Skandalbischof wurde ernannt, 18.6.2009.
 Teemu Sippo SCJ: Position Paper of marriage to protect the Catholic Church . 19.3.2009. Subsequent Helsinki 11.8.2009.
 Teemu Sippo SCJ: Trenton and the Vatican II exhibition Kotimaa.fi . 17.3.2009. Subsequent Helsinki 11.8.2009.
 Katholische Nachrichten kreuz.net, Wie viele Reserve hat die Kirche noch?, 5.7.2010.
 Fides - Catholic Diocese of Journal 09/2011, p 7, 13/2011, p 6.
 M. Angela Toigo, one mouse prayers, KATT 1984, Helsinki, Finland, .
 Bernhard Welte, Nothingness light. possibility of a new religious experience. The log-books in 2008, Helsinki, Finland, .

External links
 A video recording of the consecration mass broadcast by Yle (Finnish Broadcasting Company) xx
 https://web.archive.org/web/20130304005751/http://www.ansgar-werk.de/15.0.html
 http://www.bistummainz.de/bistum/bistum/ordinariat/dezernate/dezernat_Z/pressestelle/mbn/mbn_2009/index.html#12
 http://katolinen.fi/?page_id=318
 http://suomenkuvalehti.fi/jutut/kulttuuri/teemu-sippo-on-katolinen-piispa-suomesta-vanhan-testamentin-maailma-oli-kaukana-tasa-arvoajattelusta
 http://www.kansallisbiografia.fi/kb/artikkeli/8916/
 http://www.hs.fi/kotimaa/artikkeli/Suomen+katoliselle+kirkolle+suomalainen+piispa/1135246942696

Converts to Roman Catholicism from Lutheranism
People from Lahti
1947 births
Living people
Dehonian bishops
21st-century Roman Catholic bishops in Finland
Finnish Roman Catholic bishops
Members of the Order of the Holy Sepulchre